Hua Taphan is a district (amphoe) of Amnat Charoen province, northeastern Thailand.

History
The minor district (king amphoe) was established on 15 August 1967, when four tambons: Hua Taphan, Kham Phra, Nong Kaeo, and Kheng Yai were split off from Mueang Amnat Charoen district. It was upgraded to a full district on 17 November 1971. In 1993 it was one of the districts which formed the new province, Amnat Charoen.

Geography
Neighboring districts are (from the north clockwise): Mueang Amnat Charoen and Lue Amnat of Amnat Charoen Province; Muang Sam Sip and Khueang Nai of Ubon Ratchathani province; and Kham Khuean Kaeo and Pa Tio of Yasothon province.

Administration
The district is divided into eight sub-districts (tambons), which are further subdivided into 85 villages (mubans). Hua Taphan is a township (thesaban tambon) which covers parts of tambons Hua Taphan, Nong Kaeo, and Rattanawari. There are a further seven tambon administrative organizations (TAO).

References

External links
amphoe.com
Hua Taphan Wittayakom School Website

Hua Taphan